United Nations Security Council resolution 1640, adopted unanimously on 23 November 2005, after reaffirming all resolutions on the situation between Eritrea and Ethiopia, particularly Resolution 1622 (2005), the Council demanded that Eritrea lift restrictions on the movement of the United Nations Mission in Ethiopia and Eritrea (UNMEE).

The resolution was passed after the Security Council threatened sanctions on both countries if war broke out. Ethiopian troops briefly breached the demilitarised zone and Eritrea dismissed the resolution as a reflection of "the narrow interests of [the world's] major powers".

Resolution

Observations
In the preamble of the resolution, the Council expressed concern at the Eritrean government's decision to restrict the movement of UNMEE in Eritrea from 5 October 2005, and additional limitations on its freedom of movement that implications for UNMEE's ability to carry out its mandate. It was alarmed by such measures and their impact on the maintenance of peace and security between Eritrea and Ethiopia.

The Security Council reaffirmed the role of the Temporary Security Zone (TSZ) as provided for in the Algiers Agreement, and stressed that peace could not be achieved without the demarcation of their mutual border. There was also concern at the failure of the Ethiopian government to accept the binding decision of the boundary commission, and the high concentration of troops on both sides of the TSZ.

Acts
The Council condemned restrictions placed by Eritrea on its UNMEE mission, and demanded their full reversal. It called on both Ethiopia and Eritrea to exercise restraint and refrain from threats and the use of force, and to return their deployment of forces to 16 December 2004 levels. The Secretary-General Kofi Annan was requested to report within 40 days on compliance with Security Council demands.

The resolution concluded by urging Ethiopia to accept the decision of the Ethiopia-Eritrea Boundary Commission, and welcoming efforts of UNMEE troop-contributing countries.

See also
 Badme
 Eritrean–Ethiopian War
 List of United Nations Security Council Resolutions 1601 to 1700 (2005–2006)

References

External links
 
Text of the Resolution at undocs.org

 1640
2005 in Eritrea
2005 in Ethiopia
 1640
 1640
Eritrea–Ethiopia border
November 2005 events